Reveille is the fourth album by the band Deerhoof, released in 2002. The line-up of the band at the time was Satomi Matsuzaki, John Dieterich and Greg Saunier, with Chris Cooper contributing extra guitar work on one of the tracks. Satomi Matsuzaki also created the album's cover art. It was jointly released on the record labels 5 Rue Christine and Kill Rock Stars.

Track listing
 "Sound the Alarm" - 0:20
 "This Magnificent Bird Will Rise" - 3:33
 "The Eyebright Bugler" - 0:42
 "Punch Buggy Valves" - 1:53
 "No One Fed Me So I Stayed" - 0:47
 "Our Angel's Ululu" - 1:42
 "The Last Trumpeter Swan" - 8:11
 "Top Tim Rubies" - 1:56
 "Tuning a Stray" - 0:08
 "Holy Night Fever" - 1:18
 "All Rise" - 1:09
 "Frenzied Handsome, Hello!" - 1:48
 "Days & Nights in the Forest" - 3:59
 "Hark the Umpire" - 1:19
 "Cooper" - 2:04
 "Hallelujah Chorus" - 2:45

Personnel

 John Dieterich – guitar
 Satomi Matsuzaki – bass guitar and vocals
 Greg Saunier – drums and vocals
 Chris Cooper – guitar, only on "Cooper"

References

Deerhoof albums
2002 albums
Kill Rock Stars albums
5 Rue Christine albums